Parnall's Canal was a half mile long canal that was built in Cornwall in about 1720 near St Austell. It was closed due to a rock slide in about 1732. It was one of only five canals to be built in Cornwall, the others being the St. Columb Canal from Mawgan Porth to St. Columb, the Liskeard & Looe Union Canal, the Par Canal from Pontsmill to Par, and the Bude Canal.

References

See also

Canals of Great Britain
History of the British canal system

Canals in Cornwall
Canals opened in 1720
Industrial archaeological sites in Cornwall
1720 establishments in England